Design process can refer to:

 Any design process
 The design process used to design new products, buildings or systems
 The software engineering design process

List of design processes
The engineering design process